Conan the Fearless is a fantasy novel by American writer Steve Perry, featuring Robert E. Howard's sword and sorcery hero Conan the Barbarian. It was first published in trade paperback by Tor Books in February 1986; a regular paperback edition followed from the same publisher in January 1987, and was reprinted at least once. The first British edition was published in paperback by Sphere Books in January 1988.

The book also includes "Conan the Indestructible", L. Sprague de Camp's chronological essay on Conan's career.

Plot
Conan finds himself in the Corinthian city of Mornstadinos, after he enlists as a bodyguard defending a magician and Eldia, a girl who has control over fire elementals, against an evil mage named Sovartus. Sovartus is collecting such elemental whisperers and already has the other three. He wants Eldia to complete his set. This brings Conan into conflict with a host of other threats as well, including a demon employed by Sovartus and the witch Djuvula, who happens to be the demon's half-sister, the rich senator Lemparius, who's actually a were-panther, an avaricious thief named Loganaro, and various monsters. Plots and counter-plots build up to a climax at Sovartus' stronghold.

Reception
Ryan Harvey rates Conan the Fearless above Conan the Free Lance, one of Perry's later Conan novels, in a review of that book. Harvey assesses the author's Conan corpus in general as "goofy," noting that he "has a reputation among Conan fandom for overkill and general silliness."

"This one is pretty good," opines critic Don D'Ammassa

References

External links
Page at Fantastic Fiction 

1986 American novels
1986 fantasy novels
Conan the Barbarian novels
American fantasy novels
Tor Books books